Oddvar is a given name. Notable people with the given name include:

Oddvar Barlie (1929–2017), Norwegian sport wrestler
Oddvar Berrefjord (1918-1999), Norwegian jurist and politician
Oddvar Brå (born 1951), Norwegian former cross-country skier
Oddvar Einarson (born 1949), Norwegian movie director
Oddvar Flæte (born 1944), Norwegian politician and civil servant
Oddvar Hansen (1921–2011), Norwegian footballer and coach
Oddvar Igland (born 1963), Norwegian politician
Oddvar Klepperås, Norwegian handball player
Oddvar Nes (1938–2016), Norwegian linguist
Oddvar Wenner Nilssen (1920–1979), Norwegian sports shooter
Oddvar Reiakvam (born 1985), Norwegian politician
Oddvar Rønnestad (1935–2014), Norwegian alpine skier
Oddvar Saga (1934–2000), Norwegian ski jumper
Oddvar Sponberg (1914–1975), Norwegian race walker
Oddvar Stenstrøm (born 1946), Norwegian journalist and television host
Oddvar Torsheim (born 1938), Norwegian painter, illustrator and musician
Oddvar Bull Tuhus (born 1940), Norwegian film director and screenwriter
Oddvar Vormeland (1924–2013), Norwegian educationalist and civil servant